On 16 August 2018, severe floods affected the south Indian state Kerala, due to unusually high rainfall during the monsoon season. It was the worst flood in Kerala in nearly a century. Over 483 people died, and 15 are missing. About a million people were evacuated, mainly from Chengannur, Pandanad, Edanad, Aranmula, Kozhencherry, Ayiroor, Ranni, Pandalam, Kuttanad, Malappuram, Aluva, Chalakudy, Thrissur, Thiruvalla, Eraviperoor, Vallamkulam, North Paravur, Chellanam, Vypin Island and Palakkad. All 14 districts of the state were placed on red alert. According to the Kerala government, one-sixth of the total population of Kerala had been directly affected by the floods and related incidents. The Indian government had declared it a Level 3 Calamity, or "calamity of a severe nature". It is the worst flood in Kerala after the great flood of 99 that took place in 1924.

35 out of the 54 dams within the state were opened, for the first time in history. All five overflow gates of the Idukki Dam were opened at the same time, and for the first time in 26 years 5 gates of the Malampuzha dam of Palakkad
were opened. Heavy rains in Wayanad and Idukki have caused severe landslides and have left the hilly districts isolated. The situation was regularly monitored by the National Crisis Management Committee, which also coordinated the rescue and relief operations as the dam got opened it has disrupted many lives living nearby.

With the recurrence of flood events in the state in the subsequent years, several studies which ensued explain the manifestation of westward-propagating high frequency tropical atmospheric waves of characteristic phase speed of nearly 12 m/s, which originated near east equatorial Indian Ocean or tropical West Pacific and travelled to the east coast of Africa, and coincide with the same period of extreme rainfall events over Kerala. Moreover, the waves appeared as cyclonic and anti-cyclonic circulations trapped to the equator, which dilated the wind field and transported moisture as it propagated. The waves not only stimulated convection along its trajectory, but also ensured sufficient moisture availability. Therefore, the convective activities which intensified in the mid-troposphere, were the direct consequence of the equatorially-trapped high frequency waves, which played a significant role in driving the recurrent anomalous precipitation in the South Indian state.

Causes
The southwest monsoon was 23% excess in Kerala in the year 2018, with August of that year seeing rainfall 96% above normal. On mid-evening of 8 August, Kerala received heavy rainfall which was 116% more than the usual, resulting in dams filling to their maximum capacities. In the proceeding 48 hours, rainfall the state received  of rain. Almost all dams had been opened since the water level had risen close to overflow level due to heavy rainfall, flooding local low-lying areas. For the first time in the state's history, 35 of its 54 dams had been opened. One reason is believed to be the levelling of wetlands. The deluge has been considered an impact of the global warming.

Independent scientific studies conducted by Hydrology experts from IIT Madras, Purdue University, and IIT Gandhinagar concluded that it was the heavy downpour that resulted it the floods, and  the dam management. Based on a computer-simulation of flood storage and flow patterns by a team of researchers from IIT Madras and Purdue University, it was found that the devastation wrought by the floods cannot be attributed to the release of water from dams. Further, the scientists added that the odds of such floods were "0.06%" and no reservoir management could have considered such scenarios. Hydrology expert from IIT Gandhinagar, Prof. Vimal Mishra, identified four major factors for the floods. Unexpected above normal downpour, extreme rainfall events occurring almost across Kerala during the season, over 90% reservoir storage even before the onset of extreme rainfall events, and finally, the unprecedented extreme rainfall in the catchment areas of major reservoirs in the State led to the disaster. The prime reason for the anomalous rainfall in 2018 is the High-Frequency Mixed Rossby-Gravity Waves in the Mid-Troposphere triggered by the synoptic disturbances of the tropical Pacific. These high-frequency waves manifested as cyclonic and anticyclonic circulations and dilated the wind field to establish zones of convection in the tropics, as they propagated across the Indian Ocean basin. Although the Madden-Julian Oscillation phase with 20–40 days period has favored convection in the tropics, the high-frequency mode correlates better with the anomalous precipitation during the intervals of extreme events.<

Expert bodies like the Central Water Commission has corroborated the findings by scientists from IIT Madras, Purdue University and IIT Gandhinagar.

A report by Adv. Jacob P. Alex, an amicus curiae appointed by the Kerala high court, alleged that the devastating floods of 2018 was the result of bad dam management by the state government. All 79 dams in the state were maintained with the objective to generate hydroelectricity or irrigation and controlling flood wasn't their purpose, amicus curiae Jacob P Alex's report highlighted. "The major concern of the dam operators was to maximise reservoir levels, which conflicted with the flood control purpose for which the dams could be utilised. The 'flood cushion' of reservoirs – the storage space earmarked in dams to absorb unanticipated high flows – needed review as per the latest guidelines," Alex wrote in his report. "Sudden release of water simultaneously from different reservoirs, during extreme rainfall aggravated the damage,"it said adding that various alerts —blue, orange and red—had been issued not in accordance with the EAP guideline. "No proper follow-up action and effective precautionary steps (especially for evacuating people and accommodating them in safe location) were taken after issuance of Red Alert," it said. However, Honorable high court of Kerala cleared on 20 August 2019 that the amicus curiae report is not accepted and court cannot be used for political battles and arguments.

The Government of Kerala argued in the Supreme Court that the very sudden release of water from the Mullaperiyar Dam by the Tamil Nadu government was one of the reasons for the devastating flood in Kerala. The Tamil Nadu government rejected the argument, saying that Kerala suffered the deluge due to the discharge of excess water from 80 reservoirs across Kerala, spurred by heavy rains from within the state; It also argued that the flood surplus from the Idukki dam is mainly due to the flows generated from its own independent catchment due to unprecedented heavy rainfall, while the discharge from Mullaperiyar dam was significantly less. Though it is difficult to attribute any single event to climate change, its possible role in causing the heavy rainfall event over Kerala cannot be ruled out.

Impact

Over 489 people died, 14 are missing and 140 are hospitalized, while The Economic Times reported that 33,000 people were rescued. The Kerala State Disaster Management Authority has placed the state in a red alert as a result of the intense flooding. A number of water treatment plants were forced to cease pumping water, resulting in poor access to clean water, especially in northern districts of the state.
Over 3,274 relief camps have been opened at various locations to accommodate the flood victims. It is estimated that 1,247,496 people have found shelter in such camps. The flooding has affected hundreds of villages, destroyed an estimated  of roads and thousands of homes have been damaged or destroyed. The Government cancelled Onam celebrations, and the allocated funds have been reallocated to relief efforts.

On 12 August, Cochin International Airport, India's fourth busiest in terms of international traffic, and the busiest in the state suspended all operations until 29 August, following runway flooding. All schools throughout the state except Sainik School Kazhakootam have been closed, and tourists have been dissuaded or banned from some districts due to safety concerns. Kochi Metro was closed briefly on 16 August, and later offered free service to aid those affected by the flooding. Due to heavy rain and rising water levels the southern railway had suspended train services on the Thiruvananthapuram-Kottayam-Ernakulam and Ernakulam-Shoranur-Palakkad sections.

Rescue

Rescue operation at government level
Being instructed by ISRO the Cabinet Secretary, senior officers of Defence Services, NDRF, NDMA and secretaries of Civilian Ministries conducted meetings with Kerala Chief Secretary. Following the decisions taken during these meetings, the centre launched massive rescue and relief operations. In one of the largest rescue operations 40 helicopters, 31 aircraft, 182 teams for rescue, 18 medical teams of defence forces, 90 teams of NDRF and 3 companies of Central Armed Police Forces were pressed into service along with over 500 boats and necessary rescue equipments.

Rescue Operation by Public 
WhatsApp groups sprung up as Control Centers that coordinated help and support across various areas. A good majority of the population were involved in arranging supplies and help material in various ways.
The government gave free food to everyone who needed their help and rescued people that were stuck on high buildings.

Rescue operation by fishermen
 According to the government's estimate, a total of 4,537 fishermen community from kollam district participated in the rescue operation with 669 fishing boats. They managed to rescue more than 65,000 people from various districts. Pinarayi Vijayan honoured the fishermen and the Fisheries Minister J. Mercykutty Amma said that the government will provide financial aid to repair the fishing boats which were partially damaged in the rescue operations while new ones will be provided for those boats which were completely destroyed. According to estimates, seven boats were completely destroyed, while 452 were partially destroyed.

Relief and monetary aid

Government, NGOs and NPOs
The Government of Kerala started a donation website for flood victims.
This is in addition to  already made available in SDRF of the State and  announced on 12 August 2018 by the Home Minister. The central government also said in its press release that this  is only the advance assistance and that additional funds will be released by the NDRF when an inter-ministerial team visits again and assesses the damage. The central government, in one of the largest rescue operations, deployed 40 helicopters, 31 aircraft, 500 boats, 182 rescue teams and 18 medical teams of defence forces, 58 teams of NDRF and 7 companies of Central Armed Police Forces. Together they saved over 60,000 human lives.
The Governments of Maldives, Pakistan, Thailand and Qatar extended condolences and offered humanitarian assistance and monetary aid.
Mata Amritanandamayi Math donated  to the Kerala Chief Minister's Distress Relief Fund, in addition to providing relief materials and helping in rescue operations.
People's Foundation, an NGO based in Calicut, with the support of Ideal Relief Wing Kerala had served with 37,000 volunteers for rescue and hygiene operations. Their volunteers had cleaned 11,139 houses and conducted 494 relief camps for flood victims.
A fundraising campaign started via the Federation of Malayalee Associations of Americas (FOMAA) 2018 – 2020 leadership, later migrating to Facebook procured over 260 donors from across the world and was able to raise enough money to build more than forty homes and dedicate various villages across districts of Kerala.
A fundraising campaign started on Facebook by charitable organisations Knanaya Catholic Yuvajanavedhi of Chicago and Care and Share along with a person named Arun Simon Nellamattom and others raised and donated US$1.6 million to Kerala Chief Minister's Distress Relief Fund.
IsraAid, an Israeli NGO sent relief workers to distribute supplies and assess needs for clean water, sanitation, and psychological care.
Many Members of Parliament, Members of State Legislative Assemblies and Councils, civil servants and Government employees across the country have also donated their one month's salary and/or allowances towards Kerala Chief Minister's Distress Relief Fund.
Chief Ministers of all the states (and Delhi) have pledged monetary aid from their respective state funds in addition to dispatch of various relief materials such as potable water, blankets, packed food, rice, water-purifying machines, daily-use and healthcare products. Monetary contributions are listed below:

Housing projects for flood survivors by NGOs

Corporate and Individuals
Dr. Azad Moopen, chairman and managing director of Aster DM Healthcare has donated  to the Kerala Chief Minister's relief fund and another  for rebuilding houses in flood affected areas.
Google, Facebook, Amazon, Flipkart, BigBasket, Airtel Payments Bank, Paytm, and Google Pay have also provided an option for donation for relief efforts on their respective platforms.
Major oil companies of India such as BPCL, HPCL, IOCL, and others have collectively donated  to the Kerala Chief Minister's Distress Relief Fund, in addition to providing relief materials and helping in rescue operations.Oil and Natural Gas Corporation (ONGC) donated US$1million to Prime Ministers Relief Fund and sent relief teams with medical professionals and three helicopters for rescue and logistics support.
Adani Foundation, the CSR, sustainability and community outreach arm of the Adani Group, has committed to provide  for immediate relief and another  is earmarked for rehabilitation and resettlement.
Star India, its parent company 21st Century Fox and their employees have collectively donated .
Canara Bank, a leading nationalised public sector bank, donated  towards Kerala Chief Minister's Disaster Relief Fund. Besides this, 10 tonnes of rice packets were also donated under CSR.
Bollywood actor Sushant Singh Rajput has donated  to the Kerala Chief Minister's relief fund on behalf of an Instagram fan. He also sent his team for relief activity in Kerala. Vidya Balan, Siddharth Roy Kapoor, Shah Rukh Khan, Amitabh Bachchan, Abhishek Bachchan, Alia Bhatt, Siddharth Suryanarayan, Rishi Kapoor, Vidhu Vinod Chopra, Akshay Kumar, Suriya and Resul Pookutty are others from film industry to have contributed to Kerala Chief Minister's relief fund.
KP Hussain, chairman of Fathima Healthcare Group, has donated  to the Kerala Chief Minister's relief fund, and another  for medical relief aid.
Doctor, entrepreneur, and philanthropist Shamsheer Vayalil will donate  for the relief of flood victims by setting up a project to fight housing, education and healthcare issues.
UAE-based Indian businesses have donated  so far to Khalifa Bin Zayed Al Nahyan Foundation's relief fund. Among those to donate were Indian businessmen Yusuff Ali M.A., chairman and managing director of LuLu Group International, and Dr. B. R. Shetty, founder and chairman of NMC Health.
Bombay High Court directed Galpha Laboratories to deposit a sum of  towards the Kerala Chief Minister's Fund after losing trademark infringement case filed by Glenmark Pharmaceuticals. The court initially said that Galpha Laboratories would have to pay the sum to Glenmark Pharmaceuticals. However, Glenmark Pharmaceuticals requested the court to direct Galpha Laboratories to deposit the sum in an NGO. Following this, the court directed that the money is to be deposited in the Kerala Chief Minister's Fund.
Indian cricket team captain, Virat Kohli, dedicated his team's test win over England at Trent Bridge to the flood victims of Kerala. The Indian team has donated match fees for Kerala flood victims.
Chipsan Aviation provided 3 helicopters for rescue & Relief operations.
CHD Group, a Mangalore-headquartered public health organization led by Dr. Edmond Fernandes, MD has been working tirelessly in championing the needs of tribal communities, adivasis and other backward areas in optimizing their healthcare post disaster.

Response

At a press conference on 11 August, Chief Secretary Tom Jose said, "Things are well under control. The government is on top of the situation." Prime Minister Narendra Modi conducted an aerial survey and offered federal support to Keralites. Chief Minister Pinarayi Vijayan described the floods as "something that has never happened before in the history of Kerala" and placed some of the blame on neighbouring Tamil Nadu for releasing excess water from the state-operated Mullaperiyar dam, which worsened the situation.

International
The United States embassy urged its citizens to avoid traveling to the affected areas. The UAE embassy in India issues warning for its citizens regarding the flood. The embassy also said that the weather agencies in India have given warnings regarding heavy rainfall in the southern state of Kerala. The President of UAE Sheikh Khalifa bin Zayed Al Nahyan has instructed the formation of a national emergency committee to provide relief assistance to people affected by flash floods in the Indian state of Kerala.

There was a controversy regarding an offer of US$100 million from the Government of the UAE. The news about UAE aid started to spread with a tweet from CMO Kerala. "CM Pinarayi Vijayan informed that the United Arab Emirates will provide Kerala an assistance of ₹700 Crore. Kerala has a special relationship with UAE, which is a home away from home for Malayalees. We express our gratitude to UAE for their support. #KeralaFloodRelief". Normally the aid news will be announced by the government officials of the country which is offering the aid. Ministry of External Affairs of India clarified that they received no such offer for financial help from any country. The UAE Ambassador to India also declared that, officially, there was no announcement on donation to the State of Kerala.

Rainfall Data

Rainfall departures
Week by week departures from normal:

Cumulative rainfall by district

Percentage increase in rainfall compared to normal.

Analysis by Central Water Commission

Kerala as a whole 
According to a study by the Central Water Commission, the average cumulative rainfall of 3 days from 15 to 17 August 2018 was about 414 mm. This was almost of the same order as that of rainfall of Devikulam which occurred during 16–18 July 1924. Assuming a runoff coefficient of 0.75, the runoff generated by 3 days of intense rainfall was estimated to be 12057 MCM for the entire state of Kerala. This huge runoff was beyond the carrying capacity of most of the rivers in Kerala, resulting in bank overflows from most of the rivers.

The runoff generated from the catchment tapped by these dams during the period 15–17 August 2018 was estimated at 2.19 BCM, out of a total runoff of 12 BCM for the whole of Kerala. As per the study, with a total live storage in the state of 5.8 BCM and assuming a live storage availability of 20% on 14 August 2018, the extent of available flood moderation would have only been 1.16 BCM against an estimated inflow of 2.19 BCM. It was therefore essential to make releases from the reservoirs.

The study stated that the dams in Kerala neither added to the flood nor helped in reduction of flood, as most of the dams were already at or very close to FRL on 14 August 2018. Even if the reservoirs had been a few feet below FL, the flooding conditions would not have changed much as the heavy rainfall continued for 3–4 days. It would have been necessary to release water from the reservoirs after the first day of heavy rainfall.

The study concluded it would be necessary to review the rule curves of all reservoirs in Kerala, especially those with a live storage capacity of more than 200 MCM. This would help to create a dynamic flood cushion for moderating floods.

Periyar Basin
During the time period of 3 days from 15 to 17 August 2018, the rainfall depth realized in the Periyar basin was 588 mm. The maximum discharge passing through the Periyar at Neeleeswaram was 8800 cumecs (m3/sec) recorded at 16 August 15:00 hrs, as per the CWC's Neeleeswaram G&D site. The major storage reservoirs in the Periyar basin are the Idukki reservoir (1.4 BCM) and the Idamalayar reservoir (1.1 BCM). The peak release on 16 August 2018 from the Idukki reservoir was 1500 cumecs against an inflow of 2532 cumecs, thus achieving a flood moderation of 1032 cumecs. The release from Idamalayar on 16 August 2018 was 963 cumecs against an inflow of 1164 cumecs.

The discharge at Neeleshwaram on 17 August 2018 was 8600 cumecs. The release from Idukki and Idamalayar reservoirs were 1500 cumecs (with an inflow of 1610 cumecs) and 1272 cumecs (inflow of 1007 cumecs). CWC's analysis found that the releases of water were controlled releases as the discharge capacity of Idukki and Idamalayar dams are 5013 cumecs and 3012 cumecs, respectively.

Immediate drought after the flood
A few days after receiving one of the highest rainfalls in century, Kerala was caught under the threat of severe drought. Water level in wells, ponds and rivers have recorded lowest levels and some wells even collapsed. Chief minister Pinarayi Vijayan has directed the State council for Science, Technology & Environment to carry out studies on the phenomenon after floods across the state and suggest possible solutions to the problem.

A.B. Anita, executive director, Centre for Water Resource Development Management (CWRDM), an autonomous research institution under the State government, said heavy run-off of the top soil in the upland areas and the siltation in the rivers were the reasons for the falling water level. The top soil in the hills and upland areas had been removed in the flash floods to a depth of up to two metres in many places. As the top soil was shaved off, it ruined the hills' capacity to sponge in rainwater, she said. Ms. Anita cited ecological destruction caused by deforestation, harmful land use in the upland areas and sand mining in the streams and rivers as having contributed to the top soil run-off and siltation. This was exacerbated by the impact of climate change at the macro level.

Echoing her views, experts at the National Institute of Technology, Calicut, (NIT-C) said it was usual for the water level in the rivers and domestic wells to fall after fluvial floods. "Normally, a river flows through the sand of its own bearing till the mouth. However, this time the discharge has been full, taking the sand and the rocks in the youth-stage along with the floods. So the water level in the rivers comes down. And when the river water level is reduced, the groundwater table also does not get replenished since the rivers and groundwater table are connected," said K. Saseendran, geologist and professor at the NIT-C.

See also
 Kerala floods
2019 Kerala floods
2020 Kerala floods
 2018 in Kerala
 2004 Indian Ocean earthquake and tsunami

References

External links

Official Rescue and Information Website
 
Kerala CMDRF Donation Portal
 

2018 disasters in India
Kerala floods
August 2018 events in India
Disasters in Kerala
Floods in Kerala